The Employees’ Pension Security Act of 2009 (HR 4281) (also HR 5754 of 2008, and HR 4055 of 2005) is a proposed Act of Congress that would require all single-employer pension plans to have equal representation of employees and employers on a joint pension trust board.

Background
The Bill specifically enacts provisions that had been found in the previous Act introduced by Bernie Sanders, the Workplace Democracy Act. It was first introduced in 2005 by Peter Visclosky, and reintroduced again in 2008 and 2009.

Contents
The Act would amend the Employee Retirement Income Security Act of 1974 §403(a). The central provision is the following:

See also
US labor law
Reward Work Act
Workplace Democracy Act of 1999, HR 1277, Title III, §301

United States labor law
United States corporate law